It's Not My Fault! is a children's book about emotional literacy written by Jory John, illustrated by Jared Chapman, and published June 9, 2020 by Random House Books for Young Readers.

Reception 
It's Not My Fault! received positive reviews from Booklist, Publishers Weekly, The Bulletin, and School Library Journal. Kirkus gave it a mediocre review, stating it was "an ineffective mixture of moralistic and didactic."

References 

2020 children's books
Random House books
American picture books